The Cabinet of Dominica is appointed by the President of Dominica acting in accordance with the advice of the Prime Minister of Dominica.

Ministers of Dominica (17 December 2019 – present) 

 Roosevelt Skerrit: Prime Minister, Minister for Finance, Economic Affairs, Investment, Planning, Resilience, Sustainable Development, Telecommunications and Broadcasting
 Reginald Austrie: Minister of Housing and Urban Development
 Rayburn Blackmoore: Minister of National Security and Home Affairs
 Kenneth Darroux: Minister of Foreign Affairs, International Business and Diaspora Relations
 Fidel Grant: Minister of Blue and Green Economy, Agriculture and National Food Security
 Denise Charles: Minister of Tourism, International Transport and Maritime Initiatives
 Adis King: Minister of Youth Development and Empowerment, Youth at Risk, Gender Affairs, Seniors' Security and Dominicans With Disabilities
 Ian Douglas: Minister of Trade, Commerce, Entrepreneurship, Innovation, Business and Export Development
 Greta Roberts: Minister of Governance, Public Service Reform, Citizen Empowerment, Social Justice and Ecclesiastical Affairs
 Cozier Frederick: Minister of Environment, Rural Modernization and Kalinago Upliftment
 Irving McIntyre: Minister of Health, Wellness and New Health Investment
 Cassanni Laville: Minister of Public Works and the Digital Economy
 Roselyn Paul: Minister of Sports, Culture and Community Development
 Octavio Allfred: Minister of Education, Human resource Planning, Vocational Training and National Excellence

Ministers of State 

 Oscar George: Minister of State in the Office of the Prime Minister with Responsibility for Telecommunications and Broadcasting
 Gregory "Karessah" Riviere: Minister of State in the Ministry of Finance, Economic Affairs and Planning 
 The Late Edward Registe: Minister of State in the Ministry of Foreign Affairs, International Business and Diaspora

Parliamentary Secretaries 

 Chekira Lockhart-Hypolite: Parliamentary Secretary in the Ministry of Tourism, International Transport, and Maritime Initiatives, with special responsibility for Air and Sea Port Operations
 Kent Edwards: Parliamentary Secretary in the Ministry of Health, Wellness and New Health Investment, with particular responsibility for Community and Home Care

Ministers of Dominica (11 April 2018 – 16 December 2019) 
Hon. Roosevelt Skerrit – Prime Minister and Minister for Finance, Investments, Housing and Lands
Hon. Reginald Austrie – Deputy Prime Minister and Minister for Agriculture Food and Fisheries
Hon. Levi A. Peter - Attorney General
Hon. Dr. John Colin McIntyre – Minister for Public Works, Water Resource Management and Ports
Hon. Joseph Isaac - Minister for the Environment, Climate Resilience, Disaster Management and Urban Renewal
Hon. Dr. Kenneth Darroux – Minister for Health and Social Services
Hon. Senator Miriam Blanchard – Minister for Planning, and Economic Development
Hon. Senator Robert Tonge – Minister for Tourism and Culture
Hon. Catherine Lady Daniel – Minister for Ecclesiastical Affairs, Family and Gender Affairs
Hon. Justina Charles – Minister for Youth, Sports, and Constituency Empowerment
Hon. jaco parrot – Minister for Justice, Immigration and National Security
Hon. Senator Francine Baron – Minister for Foreign and CARICOM Affairs
Hon. Ian Douglas – Minister for Trade, Energy and Employment
Hon. Petter Saint. Jean – Minister for Education and Human Resource Development
Hon. Roslyn Paul – Minister for Commerce, Enterprise and Small Business Development
Hon. Kelver Darroux – Minister for Information, Science, Telecommunications and Technology
Hon. Cassius Darroux – Minister for Kalinago Affairs
Hon. Johnson Drigo – Minister in the Ministry of Housing and Lands
Hon. Ivor Stephenson – Parliamentary Secretary in the Ministry of Health and Social Services

Ministers of Dominica ( – 10 April 2018) 
Roosevelt Skerrit - Prime Minister and Minister for Finance, and Public Service
Levi Peter - Attorney General
Justina Charles - Minister for Youth, Sports, Culture and Constituency Empowerment 
John Collin McIntyre - Minister for Planning, economic Development and Investment
Reginald Austrie - Minister for Housing, Lands and Water Resource Management
Senator Mirium Blanchard - Minister for Public Works and Ports
Johnson Drigo - Minister for Agriculture and Fisheries
Catherine Daniel - Minister for Social Services, Family and Gender Affairs
Ian Douglas - Minister for Trade, Energy and Employment
Rayburn Blackmoore - Minister for Justice, Immigration and National Security
Petter Saint-Jean - Minister for Education and Human Resource Development
Roselyn Paul - Minister for Commerce, Enterprise and Small Business Development
Kenneth Darroux - Minister for Health and Environment
Kelver Darroux - Minister for Information, Science, Telecommunication and Technology
Casius Darroux - Minister for Kalinago Affairs
Senator Robert Tonge - Minister for Tourism and Urban Renewal
Senator Francine Baron - Foreign Affairs and CARICOM Affairs
 - Minister of State in the Office of the Prime Minister, responsible for Project Planning and Implementation
Ivor Stephenson - Parliamentary Secretary in the Ministry of Health and Environment with specific responsibility for the Environment

References 

Government of Dominica
Dominica